Schuppe is a surname. Notable people with the surname include:

 John Schuppe (fl. 1753–1773), Dutch silversmith working in London
 Marianne Schuppe (born 1959), vocalist, author, and composer
 Wilhelm Schuppe (1836–1913), German positivist philosopher